Neosalurnis is a genus of planthoppers in the family Flatidae, erected by William Lucas Distant in 1910.  It was subsequently placed in tribe Flatini, subtribe Phyllyphantina by Metcalf (1957)  Records of occurrence (possibly incomplete) are currently from Vietnam and China.

Species
Fulgoromorpha Lists on the Web includes:
 Neosalurnis bonenda Medler, 1992
 Neosalurnis decalis Medler, 1992
 Neosalurnis gracilis (Melichar, 1902) - type species(as Phyllyphanta gracilis Melichar, 1902, then Lawana bicarinata Distant, then Neosalurnis reticulatus Distant, 1910)
 Neosalurnis insignis Medler, 1992
 Neosalurnis insula Medler, 1992
 Neosalurnis magnispinata Wang, Peng & Yuan, 2005
 Neosalurnis teralis Medler, 1992

References

External links
BUGS FOR THE AMATEUR (Hong Kong): Image of Neosalurnis cf. gracilis

Flatidae
Auchenorrhyncha genera
Hemiptera of Asia